Tučapy may refer to:

 Tučapy (Tábor District), a village in the Czech Republic
 Tučapy (Vyškov District), a village in the Czech Republic
 Tučapy (Uherské Hradiště District), a village in the Czech Republic